Datuk Dato' Mohammed Suffian Bin Awang (born 1971) is the political secretary for the current Prime Minister of Malaysia. Suffian is the advisor for the Kuntao Tekpi Malaysia a martial art organization practicing the ancient art of Malay self-defence. He is also an UMNO Youth Exco.

Personal life
Mohamed Suffian bin Awang was born and raised in Kuantan, Pahang, Malaysia. He is married to Datin Mazita Binti Osman. The couple have four children Muhammad Muqreez (21 years old), Muhammad Musyreef (19 years old), Muhammad Meerza (15 years old) and Marissa Surfina (7 years old).

Education
Suffian Awang received his Diploma in Public Administration  and also his Bachelor of Laws (LLB) Hons. from Universiti Teknologi MARA Shah Alam.

Politics
Suffian Awang is the youth Chief of UMNO Youth Kuantan Division and also the Chairman of the Barisan Nasional Youth Lab.

International Seminar
Datuk Suffian Awang attended the Asean100, Leadership Forum 2007 on 22–23 August 2007 at The Melia Hotel, Hanoi, Vietnam. He represents UMNO Malaysia in presenting a case study on the political effects on youth.

International Visitor Leadership Program of the United States Department of State “Citizen Participation in a Democracy” on June 26 – July 17, 2008, Washington, D.C. (Representing UMNO Malaysia).

2012 Republican National Convention, Tampa Bay Florida on 27–29 August 2012. (Representing UMNO Malaysia).

Facts
Suffian Awang's father, Awang Ahmad 81, is a member of EBAAM (Ex-British Army Association of Malaysia).

References

1971 births
Living people